Patrick Braouezec (born 11 December 1950) is a member of the National Assembly of France. He is the current President of Plaine Commune metropolitan region and represents the Seine-Saint-Denis department and is a member of the Gauche démocrate et républicaine. Patrick Braouezec is also an active member of the world organization of local and regional governments United Cities and Local Governments, and is the acting co-chair its Committee on Social Inclusion, Participatory Democracy and Human Rights.

References

1950 births
Living people
Politicians from Paris
French people of Breton descent
French Communist Party politicians
Mayors of places in Île-de-France
Deputies of the 12th National Assembly of the French Fifth Republic
Deputies of the 13th National Assembly of the French Fifth Republic